Ab Barik (also Romanized as Āb Bārīk and Āb-e Bārīk) is a village in Borborud-e Gharbi Rural District, in the Central District of Aligudarz County, Lorestan Province, Iran. At the 2006 census, its population was 34, in 5 families.

References 

Towns and villages in Aligudarz County